Cavaradossi may refer to:
 Mario Cavaradossi, a character from Tosca, an opera by Giacomo Puccini
 8945 Cavaradossi, a minor planet